The 2018 North Carolina Senate elections elected 50 members to serve in the North Carolina Senate for a two-year term starting in January 2019. The Democratic Party gained 6 seats in this election, ending the Republican supermajority that they had held since 2011 in the State Senate.

52.98% of registered voters cast ballots in this election, marking the highest turnout for a midterm election in North Carolina since 1990.

Results summary

Close races
Districts where the margin of victory was under 10%:
District 9, 0.27% (gain)
District 19, 0.74% (gain)
District 27, 1.04% (gain)
District 18, 2.55%
District 17, 4.25% (gain)
District 39, 5.78%
District 1, 6.42% 
District 3, 7.72%
District 24, 7.72%
District 7, 7.8%

Incumbents defeated in primary election
Shirley B. Randleman (R-District 30), lost a redistricting race to Deanna Ballard (R-District 45)
Dan Barrett (R-District 34), lost a redistricting race to Joyce Krawiec (R-District 31)
Joel Ford (D-District 38), defeated by Mujtaba Mohammed (D)
David Curtis (R-District 44), defeated by Ted Alexander (R)

Incumbents defeated in general election
Michael Lee (R-District 9), defeated by Harper Peterson (D)
Tamara Barringer (R-District 17), defeated by Sam Searcy (D)
Wesley Meredith (R-District 19), defeated by Kirk deViere (D)
Trudy Wade (R-District 27), defeated by Michael Garrett (D)
Jeff Tarte (R-District 41), defeated by Natasha Marcus (D)

Open seats that changed parties
Jay Chaudhuri (D-District 16) instead ran in the 15th district, seat won by Wiley Nickel (D)

Results

District 1
Incumbent Republican Bill Cook has represented the 1st district since 2013.  Cook didn't seek re-election. Representative Bob Steinburg won the open seat.

District 2
Incumbent Republican Norman W. Sanderson has represented the 2nd district since 2013.

District 3
Incumbent Democrat Erica D. Smith has represented the 3rd district since 2015.

District 4
Incumbent Democrat Milton F. (Toby) Fitch, Jr. has represented the 4th district since 2018.  Fitch won his first full term.

District 5
Incumbent Democrat Donald G. Davis has represented the 5th district since 2013 and previously from 2009 to 2011.

District 6
Incumbent Republican Majority Leader Harry Brown has represented the 6th district since 2004.  District 6 had the lowest number of votes cast in any district election in 2018.

District 7
Incumbent Republican Louis Pate has represented the 7th district and its predecessors since 2011.

District 8
Incumbent Republican Bill Rabon has represented the 8th district since 2011.

District 9
Incumbent Republican Michael Lee has represented the 9th district since 2014.  Lee was defeated for re-election by Democrat Harper Peterson.

District 10
Incumbent Republican Brent Jackson has represented the 10th district since 2011.

District 11
Incumbent Republican Rick Horner has represented the 11th district since 2017.

District 12
Incumbent Republican Ronald J. Rabin has represented the 12th district since 2013.  Rabin didn't seek re-election. Republican Jim Burgin won the open seat.

District 13
Incumbent Republican Danny Earl Britt, Jr. has represented the 13th district since 2017.

District 14
Incumbent Democrat Dan Blue has represented the 14th district since 2009.

District 15
Following redistricting, the old 16th district became the new 15th district.  Incumbent Democrat Jay Chaudhuri who has represented the 16th district since 2016, successfully sought re-election here. Brian Lewis won the highest percentage vote of any Libertarian State Senate candidate in 2018 with 3.61%.

District 16
Following redistricting, the new 16th district is an open seat which is expected to favor Democrats.  Brian Irving won the highest number of votes of any Libertarian State Senate candidate in 2018 with 3,382 votes.

District 17
Incumbent Republican Tamara Barringer has represented the 17th district since 2013. Following redistricting, this seat was made more competitive.  Barringer lost re-election to Democrat Sam Searcy.

District 18
Following redistricting, Incumbent Republicans Chad Barefoot and John Alexander had their homes both drawn into the new 18th district. The new 18th district, unlike the former 15th and 18th districts, is a competitive district which isn't safe for either party. Chad Barefoot retired, while John Alexander narrowly won re-election.  The election in district 18 had the highest number of votes cast of any district election in the 2018 elections.

District 19
Incumbent Republican Wesley Meredith has represented the 19th district since 2011.  Meredith lost re-election to Democrat Kirk deViere.

District 20
Incumbent Democrat Floyd McKissick Jr. has represented the 20th district since 2007.

District 21
Incumbent Democrat Ben Clark has represented the 21st district since 2013.

District 22
Incumbent Democrat Mike Woodard has represented the 22nd district since 2013.

District 23
Incumbent Democrat Valerie Foushee has represented the 23rd district since 2013.

District 24
Incumbent Republican Rick Gunn has represented the 24th district since 2011.

District 25
Incumbent Republican Tom McInnis has represented the 25th district since 2015.

District 26
Following redistricting, the old 29th district became the new 26th district.  Incumbent Republican Jerry Tillman, who has represented the 29th district since 2003, successfully sought re-election here.

District 27
Incumbent Republican Trudy Wade has represented the 27th district since 2013.  Wade lost re-election to Democrat Michael Garrett.

District 28
Incumbent Democrat Gladys Robinson has represented the 28th district since 2011.
This district had the largest margin of any district election in 2018.

District 29
Following redistricting, the new 29th district overlaps with much of the former 33rd district. Incumbent Republican Cathy Dunn, who has represented the 33rd district since 2017, didn't seek re-election. Eddie Gallimore defeated representative Sam Watford to win the Republican nomination and easily won the general election.

District 30
Following redistricting, most of the old 26th district became the new 30th district. Incumbent Republican President Pro Tempore Phil Berger, who has represented the 26th district and its predecessors since 2001, successfully sought re-election here.

District 31
Incumbent Republicans Joyce Krawiec, who has represented the 31st district since 2014, and Dan Barrett, who has represented the 34th district since his appointment in August 2017, sought re-election here. Krawiec narrowly defeated Barrett in the Republican primary and then she easily won the general election.

District 32
Incumbent Democrat Paul Lowe, Jr. has represented the 32nd district since 2015.

District 33
After redistricting, the old 33rd district became the new 29th district, and a new 33rd district was created. The new district includes Rowan County and Stanly County. State representative Carl Ford was the Republican nominee.

District 34
Incumbent Republican Dan Barrett has represented the 34th district since his appointment in August 2017. Barrett chose to seek re-election in the 31st district after his home in Davie County was drawn into that district. The new 34th district includes Iredell & Yadkin counties and is expected to favor Republicans. Republican Vickie Sawyer was elected to a full term here, though after already winning the GOP primary for this seat, she had been appointed to serve the balance of David Curtis's term in the 44th district.

District 35
Incumbent Republican Tommy Tucker has represented the 35th district since 2011.  Tucker didn't seek re-election.

District 36
Incumbent Republican Paul Newton has represented the 36th district since 2017.

District 37
Incumbent Democrat Jeff Jackson has represented the 37th district since 2014.

District 38
Incumbent Democrat Joel D. M. Ford has represented the 38th district since 2013.  Ford lost the Democratic primary to Mujtaba A. Mohammed, who easily won the general election.

District 39
Incumbent Republican Dan Bishop has represented the 39th district since 2017.

District 40
Incumbent Democrat Joyce Waddell has represented the 40th district since 2015.

District 41
Incumbent Republican Jeff Tarte has represented the 41st district since 2013.  Tarte lost re-election to Democrat Natasha Marcus.

District 42
Incumbent Republican Andy Wells has represented the 42nd district since 2015.

District 43
Incumbent Republican Kathy Harrington has represented the 43rd district since 2011.

District 44
Incumbent Republican David L. Curtis has represented the 44th district since 2013.  Curtis lost re-nomination to fellow Republican Ted Alexander. Curtis resigned before the end of his term and Vickie Sawyer was appointed to replace him. Alexander easily won the open seat here, while Sawyer was simultaneously elected to the newly created 34th district which contained her home.

District 45
Following redistricting, incumbent Republicans Deanna Ballard and Shirley B. Randleman had both of their homes drawn into the 45th district. The district was more Ballard's district than Randleman's, and Ballard defeated Randleman in the Republican primary. Ballard easily won the general election.

District 46
Incumbent Republican Warren Daniel has represented the 46th district and its predecessors since 2011.

District 47
Incumbent Republican Ralph Hise has represented the 47th district since 2011.

District 48
Incumbent Republican Chuck Edwards has represented the 48th district since 2016.

District 49
Incumbent Democrat Terry Van Duyn has represented the 49th district since 2014.

District 50
Incumbent Republican Jim Davis has represented the 50th district since 2011.

References

North Carolina Senate elections
senate
North Carolina